Sanja Vejnović (born 8 August 1961) is a Croatian film and television actress.

Career
Vejnović started her film career in 1978, with Branko Ivanda film Court Martial. She came under international spotlight in Vatroslav Mimica's 1981 epic The Falcon where she played Anđa, the wife of the Serbian hero Strahinja Banović. She starred in Croatian telenovela Lara's Choice, portraying protagonist's mother Mija (2011–13).

Personal life
Vejnović married filmographer Goran Mećava in 1984, and the couple have one son and one daughter.

Selected filmography
Court Martial (1978)
That's the Way the Cookie Crumbles (1979)
High Voltage (1981)
The Falcon (1981)
The Elusive Summer of '68 (1984)
The Three Men of Melita Žganjer (1998)
100 Minutes of Glory (2004)
Blurs (2011)
With Mum (2013)

References

External links

1961 births
Living people
Actresses from Zagreb
Croatian film actresses
Croatian television actresses
20th-century Croatian actresses
21st-century Croatian actresses